USS Tacoma (PG-111/PF-3), the lead ship of the  patrol frigates. The third ship of the United States Navy to be named for Tacoma, Washington, she was in commission from 1943 to 1945, and from 1949 to 1951. She also served in the Soviet Navy as EK-11 and in the Republic of Korea Navy as ROKS Taedong (PF-63).

Construction and commissioning
Tacoma was laid down on 10 March 1943, under a Maritime Commission (MARCOM) contract, MC hull No. 1421, as a patrol gunboat, PG-111, at Permanente Metals Richmond Shipyard #4, Richmond, California; she was redesignated a patrol frigate, PF-3, on 15 April 1943, and named Tacoma on 5 May 1943. Tacoma was launched on 7 July 1943; sponsored by Mrs. A. R. Bergersen; and commissioned on 6 November 1943.

Service history

US Navy, World War II, 1943–1945
After completing shakedown training off the California coast in December 1943, Tacoma reported for duty as a training ship in January 1944. She trained patrol frigate crews until 27 June 1944, when she was ordered to proceed to Alaskan waters upon completion of sea trials. However, she was plagued by unsuccessful trials and a boiler room fire and, consequently, did not report for duty at Kodiak, Alaska, until 21 October 1944. For the next four months, she conducted anti-submarine patrols and escorted supply ships and transports along the Alaskan coast and between the islands of the Aleutians chain, visiting Attu, Adak, Dutch Harbor, and other smaller Alaskan ports.

Selected for transfer to the Soviet Navy in Project Hula, a secret program for the transfer of U.S. Navy ships to the Soviet Navy at Cold Bay, Alaska, in anticipation of the Soviet Union joining the war against Japan, Tacoma departed Dutch Harbor on 23 February 1945 and steamed south for an extensive overhaul, first at San Francisco, California, then at Bremerton, Washington, to prepare for transfer to the Soviet Union.  On 10 July 1945, she arrived at Cold Bay, and began familiarization training with her new Soviet crew.

Soviet Navy, 1945–1949
Commissioned into the Soviet Navy immediately, Tacoma was designated as a storozhevoi korabl ("escort ship"), and renamed EK-11 in Soviet service. She soon departed Cold Bay, bound for Petropavlovsk-Kamchatsky, in the Soviet Union and served as a patrol vessel in the Soviet Far East.

In February 1946, the United States began negotiations for the return of ships loaned to the Soviet Union for use during World War II. On 8 May 1947, United States Secretary of the Navy James V. Forrestal informed the United States Department of State that the United States Department of the Navy wanted 480 of the 585 combatant ships it had transferred to the Soviet Union returned, EK-11 among them. Negotiations for the return of the ships were protracted, but on 16 October 1949, the Soviet Union finally returned EK-11 to the US Navy at Yokosuka, Japan.

US Navy, Korean War, 1950–1951
Reverting to her original name, Tacoma remained out of commission at Yokosuka, in a caretaker status, until the outbreak of the Korean War on 25 June 1950. She began preparations for activation in August 1950, and went back into commission on 1 December 1950, at Yokosuka. The next day, she began 15 days of shakedown training out of Yokosuka in Sagami Wan and Tokyo Bay. From 18 to 25 December 1950, she underwent post-shakedown repairs at Yokosuka, and put to sea on 26 December 1950, bound for Sasebo, Japan. On 28 December 1950, Tacoma headed for the east coast of Korea.

For the next few months, Tacoma operated with the United Nations Blockading and Escort Squadron, Task Force (TF) 95. On 30 January 1951, she joined in the bombardment phase of the amphibious feint at Kansong, and the following afternoon she performed the same duty at Kosong.  She put in at Pusan on 1 February 1951, then headed for Sasebo on 3 February 1951.  By 5 February 1951, she was back off Koreas eastern coast at Kangnung for a two-day bombardment mission there. On 7 and 8 February 1951, her gunners trained their sights on Yangyang, and then on Hwangpo, on 9 and 10 February 1951. When not pounding Hwangpo, Tacoma patrolled off Chikute Island. She returned to Sasebo, on 13 February 1951, and remained there until 19 February 1951, when she headed for Wonsan harbor in North Korea. She arrived off Wonsan, on 22 February 1951, and for the next four days joined in the operations which resulted in the successful landing of 110 Republic of Korea Marines on Sin Do, on 24 February 1951. The following day, she cleared Wonsan channel to return to Sasebo. She arrived at Sasebo, on 27 February 1951, and remained there until 10 March 1951, when she got underway for Yokosuka, and restricted repairs which lasted until 23 April 1951.

On 3 April 1951, the United States Naval Forces Far East (NavFE) organization was restructured. As a result, the Service Forces, previously fragmented among separate United States Seventh Fleet and NavFE groups, were consolidated into a new Logistics Group, designated Task Force 92. When Tacoma emerged from the shipyard at Yokosuka, in late April 1951, she was assigned to the new task organization as an escort, and she served in that capacity for the remainder of her US Navy career. From then until September 1951, she escorted supply ships between Japanese and Korean ports and to stations along the Korean coast, where she replenished United Nations warships.  She also conducted anti-submarine patrols and participated in occasional shore bombardments.

Republic of Korea Navy, 1951–1973
On 9 October 1951, the United States transferred Tacoma to the Republic of Korea. She served in the Republic of Korea Navy as ROKS Taedong (PF-63) until 28 February 1973, when she was decommissioned and returned to the US Navy, which struck her name from the Navy list on 2 April 1973, and subsequently donated her to the Republic of Korea Navy as a museum and training ship.

Awards
The US Navy awarded Tacoma three battle stars for her service during the Korean War.

Notes

References

Bibliography

External links 
 
 hazegray.org: USS Tacoma

 

Tacoma-class frigates
Ships built in Richmond, California
1943 ships
World War II frigates and destroyer escorts of the United States
Tacoma-class frigates of the Soviet Navy
World War II frigates of the Soviet Union
Cold War frigates of the Soviet Union
Cold War frigates and destroyer escorts of the United States
Korean War frigates and destroyer escorts of the United States
Tacoma-class frigates of the Republic of Korea Navy
Korean War frigates of South Korea
Museum ships in South Korea
Ships transferred under Project Hula